Bajgiran is a city in Razavi Khorasan Province, Iran.

Bajgiran may also refer to:
 Bajgiran, Chaharmahal and Bakhtiari
 Bajgiran, Markazi
 Bajgiran District, in Razavi Khorasan Province